HVC 127-41-330 is a high-velocity cloud in the constellation of Pisces. The three numbers that compose its name indicate, respectively, the galactic longitude and latitude, and velocity towards Earth in km/s. It is 20,000 light years in diameter and is located 2.3 million light years (700 kiloparsecs) from Earth, between M31 and M33. This cloud of neutral hydrogen (detectable via 21 cm H-I emissions), unlike other HVCs shows a rotational component and dark matter. 80% of the mass of the cloud is dark matter. It is also the first HVC discovered not associated with the Milky Way galaxy or subgroup (subcluster).

Astronomer Josh Simon considers it a candidate for being a dark galaxy. With its rotation, it may be a very low density dwarf galaxy of unused hydrogen (no stars), a remnant of the formation of the Local Group.

See also
 Dark galaxy
 VIRGOHI21
 LSB galaxy

References

High-velocity clouds
Dark galaxies
Local Group
Pisces (constellation)